Wu Shih-hsih (born 2 July 1963) is a Taiwanese baseball player who competed in the 1992 Summer Olympics.

He was part of the Chinese Taipei baseball team which won the silver medal. He played as infielder.

In the 1988 Summer Olympics he participated also with the team of Chinese Taipei when baseball was a demonstration sport.

External links
profile

1963 births
Living people
Baseball players at the 1988 Summer Olympics
Baseball players at the 1992 Summer Olympics
Olympic baseball players of Taiwan
Taiwanese baseball players
Olympic silver medalists for Taiwan
Sportspeople from Taichung
Olympic medalists in baseball

Medalists at the 1992 Summer Olympics
Brother Elephants managers